George Christopher Nash  (born 2 October 1989) is a British rower. He is dual Olympian, dual Olympic medal winner and three time world champion.

Education
Nash attended Lanesborough School in Guildford and Winchester College, where he was Vice-Captain of the Boat Club. He then studied Engineering at St. Catharine's College, Cambridge, where he was a member of the Cambridge University Boat Club.

Nash initially rowed in the Cambridge reserve boat, Goldie, in 2009. He rowed in Cambridge's Blue Boat in the 2010 and 2011 Boat Races, winning in 2010 and losing in 2011. He took the 2011–2012 year off from Cambridge in order to focus on the 2012 Summer Olympics. Upon his return to Cambridge for the 2012–2013 year, Nash was elected as President of the Cambridge University Boat Club. He sat in the 5-seat of the losing crew of the 2013 race. He now rows for Molesey Boat Club.

International representation
Nash first represented Great Britain at the 2006 World Rowing Junior Championships in Amsterdam. Rowing as a member of the Men's Eight, Nash placed fourth. At the 2007 Rowing World Junior Championships in Beijing, he won a gold medal in the coxless four.

In 2009 he progressed to represent Britain at the World Rowing U23 Championships in Racice, placing 9th in the coxed four. In 2010, at the World Rowing U23 Championships in Brest, Nash won a silver medal as a member of the coxless four. In 2011, Nash rowed in a pair with Oxford rower Constantine Louloudis. Louloudis and Nash won gold at the World Rowing U23 Championships that year, and also placed 7th at a Senior Rowing World Cup event in Lucerne.

Nash won the bronze medal in the coxless pair along with Will Satch of Leander Club at the 2012 Summer Olympics.

In 2013, Nash was a member of the Great Britain Men's Eight that won Britain's first ever world title in the event.

In 2014, Nash was moved into Great Britain's flagship boat, the Men's Coxless four along with Alex Gregory, Andrew Triggs Hodge and Moe Sbihi. The crew won gold medals at the 2014 European Rowing Championships in Belgrade as well as at the Rowing World Cup events in Lac d'Aiguebelette, France and Lucerne, Switzerland. The crew culminated the year with a gold medal at the 2014 World Rowing Championships.  In the men's eight, Nash came second at the 2015 European Championships and was part of the British team that topped the medal table at the 2015 World Rowing Championships at Lac d'Aiguebelette in France, where he won a gold medal as part of the eight with Matt Gotrel, Constantine Louloudis, Pete Reed, Paul Bennett, Moe Sbihi, Alex Gregory, Will Satch and Phelan Hill.

With the men's four, himself, Gregory, Sbihi and Louloudis, Nash won the 2016 European Championship and the gold medal at the 2016 Olympics.

References

External links
 
 George Nash rowing in Melbourne

1989 births
Living people
Sportspeople from Guildford
People educated at Winchester College
Alumni of St Catharine's College, Cambridge
English male rowers
Rowers at the 2012 Summer Olympics
Rowers at the 2016 Summer Olympics
Olympic rowers of Great Britain
Olympic medalists in rowing
Olympic gold medallists for Great Britain
Olympic bronze medallists for Great Britain
Medalists at the 2012 Summer Olympics
Medalists at the 2016 Summer Olympics
Cambridge University Boat Club rowers
British male rowers
World Rowing Championships medalists for Great Britain
Members of the Order of the British Empire
European Rowing Championships medalists